Peter Mann Winkler is a research mathematician, author of more than 125 research papers in mathematics and patent holder in a broad range of applications, ranging from cryptography to marine navigation. His research areas include discrete mathematics, theory of computation and probability theory.
He is currently a professor of mathematics and computer science at Dartmouth College.

Peter Winkler studied mathematics at Harvard University and later received his PhD in 1975 from Yale University under the supervision of Angus McIntyre. He has also served as an assistant professor at Stanford, full professor and chair at Emory and as a mathematics research director at Bell Labs and Lucent Technologies. He was visiting professor at the Technische Universität Darmstadt.

He has published three books on mathematical puzzles: Mathematical Puzzles: A connoisseur's collection (A K Peters, 2004), Mathematical Mind-Benders (A K Peters, 2007), and Mathematical Puzzles (A K Peters, 2021). And he is widely considered to be a pre eminent scholar in this domain. He was the Visiting Distinguished Chair for Public Dissemination of Mathematics at the National Museum of Mathematics (MoMath), gave topical talks at the Gathering 4 Gardner conferences, and wrote novel papers related to some of these puzzles.

Winkler's book Bridge at the Enigma Club was a runner up for the 2011 Master Point Press Book Of The Year award.

Also in 2011, Winkler received the David P. Robbins Prize of the Mathematical Association of America as coauthor of one of two papers in the American Mathematical Monthly.

Paul Erdős anecdote 

According to a story included in Chapter One of "The Man Who Loved Only Numbers / The Story of Paul Erdös and the Search for Mathematical Truth", Paul Erdős attended the bar mitzvah celebration for Peter Winkler's twins, and Winkler's mother-in-law tried to throw Erdős out. [Quote:]"Erdös came to my twins' bar mitzvah, notebook in hand," said Peter Winkler, a colleague of Graham's at AT&T. "He also brought gifts for my children--he loved kids--and behaved himself very well. But my mother-in-law tried to throw him out. She thought he was some guy who wandered in off the street, in a rumpled suit, carrying a pad under his arm. It is entirely possible that he proved a theorem or two during the ceremony."

References

External links
 

Year of birth missing (living people)
Living people
20th-century American mathematicians
Mathematics popularizers
Harvard University alumni
Yale Graduate School of Arts and Sciences alumni
Dartmouth College faculty
Academic staff of Technische Universität Darmstadt
Fellows of the American Physical Society